The Ministry of Finance and Economic Development (MFED, in Gilbertese, Botaki ibukin te mwane ao karikirake) is a government ministry of Kiribati, headquartered in South Tarawa.

The Minister is responsible for:
Development of Fiscal and Economic Policy
Government Investments
Government revenue and expenditure
Economic Development Committee (DCC) Secretariat
National Development Strategy (NDS)
Development Planning and Aid Administration
Government Financial and Accounting Services
Internal Auditing
Customs
Taxation
Exchange Control
Government Statistics and National Census
Banking (including Bank of Kiribati and Development Bank of Kiribati.  The World Bank, International Monetary Fund.  Asian Development Bank and other non-Government Aid Agencies)
Kiribati Insurance Corporation
Managing Government Liabilities (Loans and Guarantees)
Procurement Act

Ministers
Tiwau Awira, (1979-1983)
Boanareke Boanareke, (1983-1987)
Teatao Teannaki, (1987-1991)
Taomati Iuta, (1991-1994)
Beniamina Tinga, (1994-2003)
Nabuti Mwemwenikarawa, (2003–2007)
Natan Teewe, (2007–2011)
Tom Murdoch, (2011–2016)
Teuea Toatu, (2016–)

External link
 MFED

References

 
Government of Kiribati
Kiribati